Armin Mueller-Stahl (born 17 December 1930) is a German retired film actor, painter and author, who also appeared in numerous English-language films since the 1980s. He was nominated for the Academy Award for Best Supporting Actor for his role in Shine. In 2011, he was awarded the Honorary Golden Bear.

Early life

Mueller-Stahl was born in Tilsit, East Prussia (now Sovetsk, Kaliningrad Oblast, Russia). His mother, Editta, was from an upper-class family and became a university professor in Leipzig. His father, Alfred Müller, was a bank teller who changed the family's surname to "Mueller-Stahl". The rest of the family moved to Berlin while his father fought on the Eastern Front in World War II. Mueller-Stahl was a concert violinist while he was a teenager and enrolled at an East Berlin acting school in 1952.

Career
Mueller-Stahl was a film and stage actor in East Germany, performing in such films as Her Third and Jacob the Liar. For that country's television, he played the main character of the popular series Das unsichtbare Visier from 1973–1979, a spy thriller program designed, in co-operation with the Stasi, as a counterpart to the James Bond films. After protesting against Wolf Biermann's denaturalization in 1976 he was blacklisted by the government. Emigrating in 1980 to West Germany, he found regular work in films. These included Rainer Werner Fassbinder's Lola (1981) and Veronika Voss (1982), Andrzej Wajda's A Love in Germany (1984), Angry Harvest and Colonel Redl (both 1985), the latter about the scandal surrounding Austro-Hungarian Army Colonel Alfred Redl.

Mueller-Stahl played the Soviet general in charge of the occupied United States in the 1987 ABC television miniseries Amerika. He made his American feature film debut as Jessica Lange's character's father in Music Box (1989). His performance as a Jewish immigrant to the United States in the 1990 film Avalon was widely praised. He subsequently took character roles in Kafka by Steven Soderbergh and Night on Earth by Jim Jarmusch (both 1991). 

Mueller-Stahl won the Silver Bear for Best Actor at the 42nd Berlin International Film Festival for his performance in Utz (1992). Mueller-Stahl was nominated for an Academy Award for Best Supporting Actor for his performance as the abusive father of pianist David Helfgott in the 1996 film Shine. Mueller-Stahl was also in A Pyromaniac's Love Story (1995) and the 1997 remake of the film 12 Angry Men. Conversation with the Beast (1996) was his first film as director. In 1998, he played the German scientist and syndicate member, Conrad Strughold, in the feature film The X-Files. In 1999 he played the mastermind of a criminal gang opposite Ray Liotta and Gloria Reuben in Pilgrim, also distributed under the title Inferno.

In the early 2000s, Mueller-Stahl received a positive response for his portrayal of Thomas Mann in a German miniseries about the Mann family called Die Manns - Ein Jahrhundertroman. In 2004, Mueller-Stahl made a foray into American television, guest-starring in four episodes on the television drama series The West Wing as the Prime Minister of Israel. In 2006, he played the role of reclusive Russian artist Nikolai Seroff in Local Color. He had a role in David Cronenberg's crime drama Eastern Promises (2007) and the thriller The International (2009), both of which co-starred British-Australian actress Naomi Watts. In 2008, he won the Genie Award for Best Performance by an Actor in a Supporting Role for Eastern Promises, and Mueller-Stahl played the role of Cardinal Strauss, Dean of the College of Cardinals and the Papal conclave, in Angels & Demons (2009).

In 2011, he was awarded the Honorary Golden Bear at the 61st Berlin International Film Festival.

Since the creation of the Freya von Moltke Stiftung, working out of Berlin and Krzyżowa, he has been a supporter and linked with their work.

Filmography
 
 Heimliche Ehen (1956), as Norbert
 Die Flucht aus der Hölle (1960), as Hans Röder
 Five Cartridges (1960), as Pierre Gireau
 Star-Crossed Lovers (1962), as Michael
 … und deine Liebe auch (1962), as Ullrich Settich
 Naked among Wolves (1963), as André Höfel
 Christine (1963)
 Preludio 11 (1964), as Quintana
 Alaskafüchse (1964), as Sowjetischer Arzt
 Wolf Among Wolves (1965, TV series), as Wolfgang Pagel
 Ein Lord am Alexanderplatz (1967), as Dr. Achim Engelhardt
 Ways across the Country (1968), as Jürgen Leßtorff
 Tödlicher Irrtum (1970), as Chris Howard
 Her Third (1972), as The Blind Man
 Januskopf (1972), as Dr. Brock
 Die Hosen des Ritters von Bredow (1973), as Dechant von Krummensee
  (1974), as Mr. Slavovitz
 Jacob the Liar (1974), as Roman Schtamm
 Nelken in Aspik (1976), as Wolfgang Schmidt
 Das unsichtbare Visier (1973–1976, TV series), as Werner Bredebusch
 Die Flucht (1977), as Schmidt
 Lola (1981), as Von Bohm
  (1981, TV film), as Andreas Roth
 Veronika Voss (1982), as Max Rehbein
  (1982), as 'Gandhi'
  (1982), as Harald Liebe
 Die Flügel der Nacht (1982), as Goedel
 Embers (1983), as François Korb / Andres Korb
  (1983), as Tetzlav
  (1983), as The Lawyer
 The Wounded Man (1983), as Henri's Father
 A Love in Germany (1983), as Mayer
  (1983), as Sam
 Rita Ritter (1984)
  (1984), as Arnold
 Colonel Redl (1985), as Archduke Franz Ferdinand
 Angry Harvest (1985), as Leon Wolny
 Die Mitläufer (1985)
 Forget Mozart (1985), as Graf Pergen
 The Assault of the Present on the Rest of Time (1985), as Blind Director
 Close-Up (1985, TV film), as Dold
 Momo (1986), as Leader of the Men in Grey
 Franza (1987, TV film), as Jordan
 Amerika (1987, TV miniseries), as General Petya Samanov
  (1987), as Lutz Kehlmann
 Jokehnen (1987, TV miniseries), as Karl Steputat
 Lethal Obsession (1987), as Axel Baumgartner
 Midnight Cop  Killing Blue (1988), as Inspector Alex Glass
 Spider's Web (1989), as Baron von Rastchuk
  (1989), as Maxwell
 A hecc (1989), as Marnó, kabinos, Tamás barátja
 Music Box (1989), as Mike Laszlo
 Avalon (1990), as Sam Krichinsky
 Night on Earth (1991), as Helmut Grokenberger
 Kafka (1991), as Grubach
  (1991), as Aaron
 Utz (1992), as Baron Kaspar Joachim von Utz
 The Power of One (1992), as Doc
 Far from Berlin (1992), as Otto Lindner
 Red Hot (1993), as Dimitri
  (1993), as Movie Teller
 The House of the Spirits (1993), as Severo
 Taxandria (1994), as Karol / Virgilus
 Holy Matrimony (1994), as Wilhelm
 The Last Good Time (1994), as Joseph Kopple
 A Pyromaniac's Love Story (1995), as Mr. Linzer
 Theodore Rex (1995), as Elizar Kane
 Shine (1996), as Peter
 Conversation with the Beast (1996), as Adolf Hitler
 The Ogre (1996), as Count von Kaltenborn
 In the Presence of Mine Enemies (1997, TV Movie), as Rabbi Adam Heller
 12 Angry Men (1997, TV Movie), as Juror #4
 The Game (1997), as Anson Baer
 The Assistant (1997), as Mr. Morris Bober
 The Peacemaker (1997), as Dimitri Vertikoff
 The Commissioner (1998), as Hans Koenig
 The X-Files (1998), as Strughold
 The Thirteenth Floor (1999), as Hannon Fuller / Grierson
 The Third Miracle (1999), as Werner
 Jakob the Liar (1999), as Kirschbaum
 Jesus (1999, TV film), as Joseph
 Mission to Mars (2000), as Ray Beck (uncredited)
 Pilgrim (2000), as Mac
 The Long Run (2001), as Bertold 'Barry' Bohmer
 Die Manns – Ein Jahrhundertroman (2001, TV miniseries), as Thomas Mann
 The Story of an African Farm (2004), as Otto
 The West Wing (2004, TV series, 4 episodes), as Israeli Prime Minister Efraim 'Eli' Zahavy
 The Dust Factory (2004), as Grandpa Randolph
 Local Color (2006), as Nicholi Seroff
  (2006), as Karl Winter
 Eastern Promises (2007), as Semyon
 Buddenbrooks (2008), as Johann 'Jean' Buddenbrook
 The International (2009), as Wilhelm Wexler
 Angels & Demons (2009), as Cardinal Strauss
 Attack on Leningrad (2009), as Wilhelm Ritter von Leeb
 Knight of Cups (2015), as Fr. Zeitlinger

Awards
 Berlin Film Festival
 Silver Bear for Best Actor at the 42nd Berlin International Film Festival
 Berlinale Camera at the 47th Berlin International Film Festival
 Honorary Golden Bear at the 61st Berlin International Film Festival
Lifetime Achievement Award of Zurich Film Festival (2015)
 Genie Award for Best Performance by an Actor in a Supporting Role (2007)
 Honorary citizen of Sovetsk (2011)

See also
 List of German-speaking Academy Award winners and nominees

References

External links

1930 births
Living people
20th-century German male actors
21st-century German male actors
German male film actors
German male television actors
German film directors
People from East Prussia
People from Tilsit
Members of the Order of Merit of North Rhine-Westphalia
Honorary Golden Bear recipients
Knights Commander of the Order of Merit of the Federal Republic of Germany
Recipients of the Art Prize of the German Democratic Republic
Silver Bear for Best Actor winners
Best Supporting Actor AACTA Award winners
Best Supporting Actor Genie and Canadian Screen Award winners
German Film Award winners
East German emigrants to West Germany
German male violinists